Sara, officially the Municipality of Sara,  is a 2nd class municipality in the province of Iloilo, Philippines. According to the 2020 census, it has a population of 54,637 people.

History

1877– the Spaniards who have travelled the northward coast of Iloilo had discovered natives who with their houses built near the seashore called this "Lakdayan". The Spaniards established a seat of government in Concepcion. Its surrounding barrios are San Dionisio, Ajuy and Sara. The head of the local government of Concepcion was called Kapitan while the subordinate leaders in San Dionisio were called Tenientes and Cabezas de Barangay.

Barangay of San Dionisio includes
 Odiongan
 Capinang
 Cudionan
 Bagacay
 Nipa

1877 – A village of San Juan separated from Concepcion and became a town .  San Dionisio and Lemery were attached to San Juan . The Augustinians Fathers founded Sara into a  "pueblo" under the patronage of Saint John the Baptist, whose feast is celebrated on June 24. Formerly, it's just barrio San Juan that includes much of Ajuy. It became a regular parish in 1895 with father Paulino Diaz as curate.

Barangay of Sara
Ilongbukid, Maremhon, Lawa-an, Bai-ran, Batuan, Agsinapot, Maligayligay, Samponongbolo, Alabidhan, Ambolong, Busay, Caburra, Asue Pabriaga, Balabago, Alawehao, Quinasop-an, Bolod, Aglahog, Madarag, Serruco, Salvacion, Ajuz, Talisay, Masonson, Quipot, Quipot, Damasco.

Sara and Ajuy remained the top sugar producers in Iloilo until the onset of the American colonization, followed by Balasan, Passi and Dingle (Panay Directory and Souvenir Book, 1937).

In 1928, the Central Azucarera de Sara-Ajuy was incorporated by the Ynchausti y Cia, and established a sugar mill in Ajuy (Annual Report of the Governor General of the Philippine Islands, 1929).

Sara-Ajuy sugar central's production steadily increased, starting with 1,842 tons in 1929, it climbed to 4,046 tons and 4,716 tons in 1930 and 1931, respectively (American Chamber of Commerce Journal, August 1931).

It became the top sugar producer in Iloilo by the late 1930s, followed by the Central Santos-Lopez in Barotac Nuevo, the Philippine Starch and Sugar Co. in Janiuay and the Central Lourdes in Dingle.

Before World War II broke out, the Central Azucarera de Sara-Ajuy recorded a production of 108,725.52 piculs during the crop year 1941–1942.

"However, in the course of the Japanese invasion... there came a total blackout on the sugar milling activities," wrote historian Henry Funtecha in "Iloilo in the 20th Century: An Economic History (1997)".

After the war, Central Azucarera de Sara-Ajuy briefly resumed operations but found it difficult to recover until it eventually closed.

Sara District Hospital was founded in 1960s in Anoring, Sara as co-referral hospital for Lemery, San Dionisio, Ajuy and Conception, Iloilo.

Barangays

Sara is politically subdivided into 42 barangays.

1957 renaming
In 1957, Congress enacted Republic Act No. 1733 which renamed a lot of these barangays.

Demographics

Climate

Economy 

Sara is the Banking Center in Northern Iloilo where a number of banks are located such as Land Bank of the Philippines, RCBC and one network bank. Gaisano Grand Mall – Sara was opened on July 31, 2019.

Media
107.5 Hot FM
List of Radio & Television Station in Iloilo

References

External links
 [ Philippine Standard Geographic Code]
 Philippine Census Information
 Local Governance Performance Management System

Municipalities of Iloilo